The Mixon Rocks are rock outcrops about  west of Gadarene Ridge in the Allan Hills of Oates Land, Antarctica. They were reconnoitered by the New Zealand Antarctic Research Programme Allan Hills Expedition, 1964, who named this feature for Lieutenant William A. Mixon, a U.S. Navy medical officer at McMurdo Station who treated an injured member of the expedition.

References

Rock formations of Oates Land